Sleightholme may refer to

Places 
Sleightholme, a hamlet in County Durham (formerly in the North Riding of Yorkshire), England
Sleightholme Dale, a valley in the North York Moors, North Yorkshire, England

People 
John Sleightholme, English football investor
Jon Sleightholme (born 1972), English rugby union footballer
Ollie Sleightholme (born 2000), English rugby union footballer